Anthony Robert Mitton (10 January 1951 – 18 June 2022) was an English writer.  Originally a primary school teacher he then became a children's poetry writer.

Personal life and education 
Tony Mitton was born on 10 January 1951 in Tripoli. He was educated at Woolverstone Hall School (1961-1968) before studying English at Gonville and Caius College, Cambridge from 1969. Subsequently, he trained as a primary school teacher in the mid-1970s. He lived with his wife in Cambridge where they raised two children.

Professional career 
His career as a teacher included positions as Support Teacher in Plaistow, then a full-time primary teaching post at Earith CP School near Cambridge from 1980. In 1984 after a short gap he resumed primary school teaching as a registered supply teacher for Cambridgeshire Education Authority. In 1987 he became a permanent part-time special needs support teacher for the Cambridgeshire Special Needs Team, continuing in this post  for about 15 years. In 1994 some of his first poems for children were published.

Honours and other notable activities 

Tony Mitton won the 2014 Centre for Literacy in Primary Education (CLPE) poetry award (now called CLIPPA) for the poem 'Wayland'. Before that he won the Nottinghamshire Children's Book Award, 1997, for "Royal Raps" and the silver award at the 2000 Nestlé Smarties Book Prize (book cited below). He served as a judge for the CLPE poetry award in 2005 and 2006. His work has been included in the Children's Poetry Archive. It has also been included in anthologies such as the OUP published "Kersplosh, Kersplash, Kersplat! Funny Poems" edited by Ron Heapy. He collaborated with the Hallé Orchestra who made adaptations of  several of his works. See e.g. their productions of Dinosaurumpus and Gaia. Dinosaurumpus has also been performed by the Welsh National Opera. He was a Member of the Society of Authors. Tony Mitton's archive is held by the National Centre for Children's Books in Newcastle.

Reviews

His work has been independently reviewed in many places. For example, one of his earlier books was reviewed in the New York Times in 1999. Other reviews have appeared in Kirkus Reviews 2002 and 2003  as well as the School Library Journal 2007. Writing in the Guardian Newspaper, Julia Eccleshare (Sat 4 Oct 2003) said "Tony Mitton's The Tale of Tales, illustrated by Peter Bailey (David Fickling Books, £12.99) is a wonderful piece of storytelling told seamlessly in prose and poetry which, in the best tradition of The Canterbury Tales, shows what an excellent storytelling vehicle poetry can be." He was named by Teresa Cremin (2013) as someone whose work that has inspired reluctant readers. Many more reviews are listed in the Encyclopedia.com article cited above (towards the end, in the section "Biographical and Critical Sources"). Wayland was reviewed in The Times in 2013 "it is a delight to find a new picture book that should stand the test of time. The story of the craftsman Wayland, gorgeously retold by the award-winning poet Tony Mitton, makes the hairs on your neck rise up." In the obituary in Poetry Nation /PN Review (267, Volume 49 Number 1)  Geoffrey Pawling called him "one of Britain’s most popular and versatile children’s poets".

Books 
His most notable, prize-winning books and poems include:

The Red and White Spotted Handkerchief: silver award at the 2000 Nestlé Smarties Book Prize.

In 2005, his verse picture book with Guy Parker-Rees, Spookyrumpus, won The Sheffield Children's Book Award, The Dundee City of Discovery Picture Book Award and The Portsmouth Picture Book award. His comic rap narrative book, Royal Raps (illus. Martin Chatterton), won the Nottinghamshire Children's Book Award in 1996.

 
 
 
 
 

His work has been translated into many languages. See  VIAF listing.

More complete listings of his works are included on the  CLPE author page  and the Open library author page.

References

External links
  Personal website

Children's books
1951 births
2022 deaths